Wataru Karashima (辛島 航, born October 18, 1990, in Fukuoka, Fukuoka) is a Japanese professional baseball pitcher for the Tohoku Rakuten Golden Eagles in Japan's Nippon Professional Baseball.

External links

NPB.com

1990 births
Japanese baseball players
Living people
Nippon Professional Baseball pitchers
Baseball people from Fukuoka (city)
Tohoku Rakuten Golden Eagles players